The Broadway Bridge is an arch bridge that spans the Arkansas River connecting the cities of Little Rock, Arkansas and North Little Rock, Arkansas. It carries U.S. Route 70 (US 70). The current bridge opened to traffic in March 2017. The original bridge was demolished in 2016. It was also an arch bridge and it opened in 1923.

Current bridge
The need to replace or rehabilitate the original bridge was identified in 2010 as the structure was determined to be structurally deficient. Community desires were for a replacement bridge that included pedestrian/bicycle facilities, accommodations for a future streetcar line and an iconic design. In April 2011, the engineering firms Garver LLC and HNTB were selected to design a new bridge. The contractor is Massman Construction Company, who won the contract with a bid of $98.4 million.

The selected design includes two 450-foot spans incorporating basket handle arches. Each arch is estimated to weigh 2,000 tons.

The new bridge was opened to the public on March 1, 2017.

Original bridge

The original bridge began construction in 1921 and opened on March 14, 1923. An estimated 50,000 people attended the grand opening events.

The original five-span structure was 2,783 feet long and 40 feet wide and provided 24.3 feet of vertical clearance. The original structure was an open-spandrel, deck arch bridge made of concrete and built by the Missouri Valley Bridge and Iron Company. The bridge was developed by the Broadway-Main Street Bridge District of Pulaski County, a commission created by state legislature for the purpose of constructing bridges across the Arkansas River at Broadway and at Main Street. In 1974, two spans were removed and replaced with a single through arch span to achieve the required opening for the McClellan–Kerr Arkansas River Navigation System.

The bridge closed on September 28, 2016 for demolition of the truss span and construction of the replacement. The 1974 steel arch span was demolished on October 11, 2016. After explosives were detonated, the span remained standing until it was pulled down by tugboats five hours later. Two of three concrete arches from the original portion of the bridge were demolished on October 15, 2016, while the third arch remained standing.

See also
 
 
 
 List of crossings of the Arkansas River

References

External links
 Official Project Page for Replacement Bridge
 Broadway Bridge, at Bridgehunter.com
 

Bridges completed in 1923
Road bridges in Arkansas
Bridges of the United States Numbered Highway System
U.S. Route 70
Bridges over the Arkansas River
Concrete bridges in the United States
Open-spandrel deck arch bridges in the United States
Through arch bridges in the United States
1923 establishments in Arkansas
Buildings and structures in North Little Rock, Arkansas
Buildings and structures in Little Rock, Arkansas
Transportation in Little Rock, Arkansas
Bridges completed in 2017
2016 disestablishments in Arkansas
Demolished buildings and structures in Arkansas
Demolished bridges in the United States
2017 establishments in Arkansas
Transportation in Pulaski County, Arkansas